Lisa Shoman (born 1964) is a Belizean lawyer and politician and the Foreign Minister of Belize from 2007 to 2008. She was previously the Permanent Representative of Belize to the Organisation of American States and served concurrently as Ambassador to the United States from 24 August 2000 until 5 June 2007, when she was appointed Foreign Minister. She was the first woman Ambassador of Belize to the United States. At the same time she was made a member of the Senate of Belize on the recommendation of Prime Minister Said Musa.

Early life

Lisa Shoman was born in 1964. She is the eldest of three daughters born to commercial pilot and businessman Yasin Shoman and Hilda Shoman (née Hoy). She completed her primary and secondary education in her native Belize, followed by legal studies at the University of the West Indies (Mona Campus) and the Norman Manley Law School in Jamaica.

Career

Shoman was called to the bar in October 1988, and appointed Crown Counsel in the Office of the Director of Public Prosecutions (July 1988), serving for over a year before entering private practice. She was elected the first female president of the Bar Association of Belize in 1996. While in her mid-30s, Shoman was appointed to Chair the Board of Directors of Belize Telecommunications Limited (1998–2000). In December 2009, she was elevated to the rank of Senior Counsel by the Chief Justice of Belize, Dr Abdulai Conteh.

Her first national appointment came in 2000 when she became Ambassador/Permanent Representative of Belize to the Organization of American States on August 25, 2000, and she served concurrently as High Commissioner of Belize to Canada until 2003. She was also appointed Belize’s Ambassador to the United States in August 2000. During her tenure, Shoman served as Vice-Chair of the Permanent Council of the OAS.

In June 2007, then Prime Minister Said Musa appointed her to the Senate of Belize, and made her the country’s first female Minister of Foreign Affairs & Foreign Trade. Shoman held this position until Musa’s party, the People's United Party, ceded power in 2008, when she returned to private practice.

Shoman has remained an active advocate, heading the legal team challenging controversial Constitutional changes proposed by the ruling United Democratic Party. When Prime Minister Dean Barrow alleged that his predecessor, Said Musa had secretly diverted public funds and charged him with theft, Shoman was on the legal team that ensured Musa’s acquittal.

Leader of the Opposition Johnny Briceño appointed Shoman as a senator for a second time in 2009.

Personal life

In 2009, Shoman married Caribbean writer Joey Clarke.

References

A Tribute to Lisa Shoman on her appointment to Foreign Minister of Belize

Decoration of the Mexican Order of the Aztec Eagle

1964 births
Living people
Belizean lawyers
Female foreign ministers
Women government ministers of Belize
Members of the Senate (Belize)
People's United Party politicians
Foreign ministers of Belize
Government ministers of Belize
Permanent Representatives of Belize to the Organization of American States
Ambassadors of Belize to the United States
High Commissioners of Belize to Canada
People associated with the Norman Manley Law School
Belizean women diplomats
Women ambassadors
Senior Counsel